Haroon and Sharoon Leo (born July 27, 1993), professionally known as Leo Twins, are Pakistani musicians and multi-instrumentalists. Leo Twins started their career in popular TV show Nescafé Basement. The twin brothers have been a regular part of the house band in Nescafe Basement produced by Zulfiqar Jabbar Khan.

Life and career 
Born in Rawalpindi to a Christian family, the Leo Twins studied at the Punjab College of Information Technology. They started their career from Nescafe Basement Season 3.  Sharoon, the elder brother, plays violin and cello while Haroon plays more than 10 instruments including guitar, rubab, tabla, piano, cajon, ukulele, mandolin, darbuka, and other percussion instruments. Leo Twins actively release instrumental covers and originals on their YouTube Channel. Haroon Leo and Sharoon Leo also play with some of the renowned names in the music fraternity such as Atif Aslam, Meesha Shafi, Call (band), Momina Mustehsan and Rahat Fateh Ali Khan. They were also a part of Pakistan Super League team Peshawar Zalmi's team anthem Hum Zalmi. Leo Twins' version of Diriliş: Ertuğrul soundtrack proved to be an instant hit and gained viewership from all over the world.

Discography

Nescafe Basement 

 Season 3
 Mein Hoon - Season 4
 Season 5

Singles & covers 

 Sayonee (Cover)
 Despacito
 National Anthem
 Tu Hi Dua
 Shape Of You - Ed Sheeran (Cover)
 Kalvari De Saharay 
 Ko Ko Korina - Cover
 Ertugrul Ghazi (Soundtrack)
Game of Thrones (Soundtrack)
Sanson Ki Mala 
Aadat by Atif Aslam

References

External links 
Leo Twins on Facebook

Living people
Pakistani musicians
Pakistani multi-instrumentalists
Pakistani violinists
Year of birth missing (living people)
Pakistani Christians
Pakistani musical duos
Twin musical duos
Pakistani twins